Menchie's Frozen Yogurt is an American frozen yogurt chain company founded in 2007, based in the San Fernando Valley, California area. Menchie's offers self-serve frozen yogurt with different choices of yogurt flavors and toppings. Menchie's has 433 locations and can be found in the United States, Puerto Rico, Canada, Japan, India, China, Bahrain, The Bahamas, Kuwait, United Arab Emirates, Kingdom of Saudi Arabia, and Qatar.

History 
The first store was opened in Los Angeles on May 15, 2007.
The idea for a store originated from the couple's mutual love for yogurt. The name Menchie came from Adam Caldwell's nickname for Danna, and it is also the name of their company's mascot.

In popular culture

CEO Amit Kleinberger appeared in two episodes of Undercover Boss.

See also 
 List of frozen yogurt companies
 List of frozen dessert brands

References 

Companies based in California
Ice cream parlors
Fast-food chains of the United States
Restaurants established in 2007
Frozen yogurt businesses
American companies established in 2007
Brand name frozen desserts
Ice cream brands
2007 establishments in California